Not of This Earth may refer to:

Movies
Not of This Earth (1957 film), directed by Roger Corman
Not of This Earth (1988 film), directed by Jim Wynorski
Not of This Earth (1995 film), directed by Terence H. Winkless

Albums
Not of This Earth (Joe Satriani album) and its title track, released in 1986
Not of This Earth (The Damned album), released in 1995

Songs
 "Not of This Earth", a song by Prong from their 1994 album Cleansing
 "Not of This Earth", a song by Robbie Williams from the Bridget Jones's Diary soundtrack